The 1983–84 Michigan State Spartans men's basketball team represented Michigan State University in the 1983–84 NCAA Division I men's basketball season. The team played their home games at Jenison Field House in East Lansing, Michigan and were members of the Big Ten Conference. They were coached by Jud Heathcote in his eighth year at Michigan State. The Spartans finished with a record of 15–13, 8–10 to finish in a tie for fifth place in Big Ten play.

Due to NCAA sanctions against Wisconsin for providing improper benefits for players, MSU's official record for the year is 16–12, 9–9.

The season is notable as the first season future Spartan head coach Tom Izzo was an official assistant coach under Heathcote.

Previous season
The Spartans finished the 1982–83 season with a record of 17–13, 9–9 to finish in sixth place in Big Ten play. The Spartans received an invitation to the National Invitation Tournament where they defeated Bowling Green State before losing to Fresno State.

Roster and statistics 

Source

Schedule and results

|-
!colspan=9 style=| Regular season

Awards and honors
 Sam Vincent – All-Big Ten First Team

References

Michigan State Spartans men's basketball seasons
Michigan State
Michigan State Spartans men's b
Michigan State Spartans men's b